The Word catheter is a type of balloon that is placed in the Bartholin gland cyst after incision and drainage to allow continued drainage and re-epithelialization of a tract for future drainage. The stem of the Word catheter is latex.

References

Further reading 
https://first10em.com/word-catheters/

Medical equipment